The 2019 World's Ultimate Strongman took place in Dubai, United Arab Emirates between October 24th and 25th. The winner of the inaugural World's Ultimate Strongman Hafþór Júlíus Björnsson did not partake this year due to taking a small break from competing. 2019 World's Strongest Man Martins Licis also did not partake due to injury. The competition had four-time World's Strongest Man Žydrūnas Savickas as a referee; 2017 World's Strongest Man Eddie Hall and 2016 Europe's Strongest Man Laurence Shahlaei were commentators of the event.

This years event was held over two days with first day consisting of only one event; the max deadlift. This event was performed with the Burj Khalifa in the background. The second day and the remainder of the events were performed at the Meydan Racecourse.
This is also where the athletes were staying for the competition.

Results of events

Event 1: Max Deadlift
Starting Weight: 
Notes: Athletes were allowed to skip weight increments.

Event 2: Truck Pull
Weight:  
Course Length:

Event 3: Log Lift
Weight:  log for repetitions

Event 4: Carry Medley
Weight:  yoke,  shield 
Course Length:

Event 5: Atlas Stones
Weight: 10 stone series ranging from

Final Results

References

Strongmen competitions
Men's sports competitions
2019 in Emirati sport